Post Alley Pizza is a pizzeria in Seattle, in the U.S. state of Washington.

Description 
In addition the pizza, the menu has included English muffin sandwiches; the restaurant has served BEC, sausage, and vegetarian varieties, as well as one with bacon, cashew butter, roasted delicata squash, and honey.

History 
The business is owned by Andrew Gregory. In 2021, Post Alley Pizza collaborated with Ben's Bread on a French bread pizza.

Reception 
Jake Uitti ranked the pizzeria seventh place in The Stranger 2018 "pizza pie face off", a search for Seattle's best slice. Jackie Varriano included the business in The Seattle Times 2020 list of "4 great spots to grab a scrumptious breakfast sandwich in the Seattle area". Post Alley Pizza was included in Eater Seattle 2021 overview of "breakfast sandwiches in Seattle worth waking up early to get". In 2022, the website's Jade Yamazaki Stewart included the business in an overview of "where to find exceptional pizza in Seattle" and list of 20 "great" restaurants near Pike Place Market. Allecia Vermillion included Post Alley Pizza in Seattle Metropolitan 2022 list of 13 "exceptional" breakfast sandwiches.

References

External links 

 
 Post Alley Pizza at Zomato

Central Waterfront, Seattle
Italian restaurants in Seattle
Pizzerias in Washington (state)